Alkylphenols are a family of organic compounds obtained by the alkylation of phenols. The term is usually reserved for commercially important propylphenol, butylphenol, amylphenol, heptylphenol, octylphenol, nonylphenol, dodecylphenol and related "long chain alkylphenols" (LCAPs). Methylphenols and ethylphenols are also alkylphenols, but they are more commonly referred to by their specific names, cresols and xylenols.

Production 
The long-chain alkylphenols are prepared by alkylation of phenol with alkenes:
C6H5OH  + RR'C=CHR"   →   RR'CH−CHR"−C6H4OH
In this way, about 500M kg/y are produced.

Environmental controversy over nonylphenols 
Alkylphenols are xenoestrogens. Long chain Alkylphenols have the most potent estrogenic activity. The European Union has implemented sales and use restrictions on certain applications in which nonylphenols are used because of their alleged "toxicity, persistence, and the liability to bioaccumulate" but the United States EPA has taken a slower approach to make sure that action is based on sound science.

Uses of long-chain alkylphenols 
Alkylphenols is a raw non-polar material when paired with their percussor alkylphenols ethoxylate a water-soluble material where the long-chain alkylphenols are used extensively as precursors to the detergents, as additives for fuels and lubricants, polymers, and as components in phenolic resins.  These compounds are also used as building block chemicals that are also used in making fragrances, thermoplastic elastomers, antioxidants, oil field chemicals and fire retardant materials.  Through the downstream use in making alkylphenolic resins, alkylphenols are also found in tires, adhesives, coatings, carbonless copy paper and high performance rubber products.  They have been used in industry for over 40 years.

References